Shazia Manzoor (Punjabi) is a Pakistani playback and folk singer. She is known for her song, "Chann Meray Makhna".

Early life and career
Shazia Manzoor was born in Rawalpindi, Punjab, Pakistan. She first started singing by performing at college shows at Rawalpindi. Shazia Manzoor was trained in music by Ustad Feroz of Gwalior gharana.

She is a popular singer in Pakistan and India; and among the Punjabi diaspora. Shazia Manzoor sings mostly Punjabi music. She sang various Punjabi folk songs and Punjabi Sufi poems. She also sometimes sings Urdu songs.

Popular songs 
She is popular for her following songs: 
 Aaja Sohniya, 
 Mahi Aavega 
Maye Ni Kinnu Akhan 
Chann Mere Makkhna 
 Dhol Mahia 
  Akh Da Nasha 

She has also performed at some charity concerts after the 2010 Pakistan floods to raise funds for the flood victims.
Shazia was introduced in 1992 by the popular comedian, Umer Shareef, as she stated in her interview during a tribute to Noor Jehan  with Zille Huma.

She was a featured artist for Coke Studio (Pakistan) (Season 8 in 2015). She has performed at the BBC Philharmonic Orchestra in London.

Selected albums 
Raatan Kaaliyan (June 1998)
Aarfana Kalaam (August 1999)
Chan mere Makhna (December 2001)
Hai Dil Jani (September 2003)
Ishq Sohna (August 2009)
Tu Badal Gaya (March 2010)
Jatt London (February 2011)
Balle Balle (May 2011)
Sahib teri bandi haan (February 2012)
Dhokebaaz (Chip Shop) (November 2012)
Aish Karo (April 2015)
’’Akh Da Nasha’’ (August 2018)
Burger & Chips Shop (July 2019)
Her performance in Coke Studio Season 8, Episode 6 has received critical acclaim for the Awadhi wedding song "Hare Hare Bans" along with Ustad Rizwan and Ustad Muazzam.

Duo collaboration
 1999: Dark And Dangerous (With Bally Jagpal)
 2001: Untruly Yours (With Bally Jagpal)
 2001: Vix It Up (With DJ Vix)
 2002: Dark And Direct (With Bally Jagpal)
 2005: Groundshaker (With Aman Hayer)
 2009: Collaborations 2 (With Sukshinder Shinda)
 2014: 12B (With Bally Jagpal)
 2014: Collaborations 3 (With Sukshinder)  
 2018: Akh Da Nasha (Zakir Amanat)

Playback singer for films
Shazia Manzoor has also done film playback singing for films including Pal Do Pal (1999 film) and Ishq Khuda (2013). Her singing in the 2003 commercially successful film was widely praised by the public.

References

External links
 , Filmography of Shazia Manzoor

Pakistani folk singers
Punjabi-language singers
People from Rawalpindi District
Living people
Punjabi people
Punjabi singers
Nigar Award winners
Pakistani playback singers
Year of birth missing (living people)
Coke Studio (Pakistani TV program)
 20th-century Pakistani women singers